William Robb Eaton (December 17, 1877 – December 16, 1942) was a U.S. Representative from Colorado, nephew of Charles Aubrey Eaton.

Early life and education
Born in Pugwash, Province of Nova Scotia, Canada, his parents were Cyrus B. and Margaret S. (Whidden) Eaton. He was of New England ancestry. Eaton immigrated to the United States with his parents who settled in Boston, Massachusetts, in 1878, and in Denver, Colorado, in 1881. He attended public and private schools.

Career and law school
Beginning at the age of 12, he was employed as a bank clerk from 1889 to 1901. He engaged as a jobber and wholesaler and in the warehouse business 1901 to 1909. He served in Troop B, First Squadron Cavalry, National Guard of Colorado from 1898 to 1904. He served during the Spanish–American War.

He was graduated from the law department of the University of Denver in 1909. He was admitted to the bar the same year and commenced practice in Denver, Colorado. He served as deputy district attorney of the second judicial district 1909 to 1913.

He served as member of the State senate 1915 to 1918 and 1923 to 1926. He was a sponsor of the Colorado State Workmen's Compensation Law in 1915. He specialized in oil and shale land property rights, insurance, mining, and corporate law. He served on the Public Lands Committee. He was interested in the establishment of military installations and the expansion of the Fitzsimons General Hospital near Denver.

Eaton was elected as a Republican to the 71st and 72nd Congresses (March 4, 1929 – March 3, 1933). He was an unsuccessful candidate for reelection in 1932 to the 73rd Congress and for election in 1934 to the 74th Congress. His loss in 1932 is attributed to his position that the prohibition should not have been repealed.

He resumed the practice of law in Denver, Colorado. He was a member of the Masonic Temple, the city, state, national and international bar associations, the National Association for Constitutional Government. He was also a member of the Sons and Daughters of the Pilgrims and the Colorado State Historical Society.

Personal life
On September 16, 1909, he married Liela Carter. She was president of the board of the State Industrial School for Girls at Mt. Morrison. Her residence was the Colburn Hotel in Denver.

He died in Denver on December 16, 1942 as the result of complications following surgery and was interred in Denver's Fairmount Cemetery.

References

External links 
 
 William R. Eaton, Masonic history
 Uncle and nephew combination in Congress, Rep. Charles A. Eaton of New Jersey, (right) and his nephew Rep. William R. Eaton of Colorado, are both members of the special session of Congress

1877 births
1942 deaths
Canadian emigrants to the United States
Politicians from Denver
Lawyers from Denver
University of Denver alumni
Colorado National Guard personnel
Republican Party members of the United States House of Representatives from Colorado